The Fleur de Lis Ball is a formal cotillion ball in St. Louis, Missouri, for adolescents of affluent society around the Roman Catholic Archdiocese of St. Louis, started in 1958 by a group of Catholic upper-class women. It teaches etiquette and ballroom skills to young debutante women and men. Four years of classes end with the Fleur de Lis Ball itself, which benefits Cardinal Glennon Children's Hospital. Female guests wear white debutante gowns with gloves, and are escorted and presented to the Archbishop of St. Louis. It is one of two major cotillion balls in Saint Louis.

See also
 Veiled Prophet Ball - St. Louis's other debutante cotillion
 Jewel Ball - another debutante cotillion in Missouri

References

Debutante balls
Culture of St. Louis
Roman Catholic Archdiocese of St. Louis
Balls in the United States
Catholic culture
History of women in Missouri